Hello Punjab was a BBC Hindustani Radio programme broadcast, hosted by Princess Indira Devi of Kapurthala during World War II for sending recorded voice messages of Punjabi soldiers of Indian Sub-continent fighting against Axis in different parts of the world under British Rule to their families residing in various parts of Punjab.

See also
Talking to India

References

Further reading

World War II and the media
Punjabi diaspora